Jenny Rosenthal Bramley (July 31, 1909 – May 26, 1997) was a Russian-born American physicist. She holds numerous patents on Electroluminescence and Electro-optics and is cited by the IEEE as being "well known for her innovative work in lasers.”   She was the second woman elected as a fellow of the IEEE.

Personal life 
Bramley was born Jenny Rosenthal in Moscow on July 31, 1909. Her parents were Lithuanian, and she and her family left Russia as part of a hostage exchange between Lithuania and the Soviet Union. She attended high school in Berlin and earned her bachelor's degree from the University of Paris in 1926 at age 16.

She spoke English, Russian, French, and German and used her translation skills many times at professional meetings and to translate technical articles.

Bramley received both a master's degree in 1927 and a doctorate in 1929 at age 19 from New York University (NYU). University officials at NYU claim she became the first woman to receive a Ph.D. in physics from an American institution. However, three women (Mary Chilton Noyes, Caroline Willard Baldwin, and Isabelle Stone) were awarded doctorates in physics from American institutions in the nineteenth century, and evidence suggests at least 26 women earned doctorates in physics before 1929.

Bramley met her husband, Dr. Arthur Bramley, while working as a physicist at the United States Army Signal Corps Engineering Laboratory in Belmar, NJ.  She died on May 26, 1997, at age 87 in Lancaster, PA, and is survived by a daughter, son, eleven grandchildren, and one great-granddaughter.

Career 
After graduating from New York University Bramley did research at Johns Hopkins University and the University of Michigan before teaching at Brooklyn College and New York University.

Along with Gregory Breit, Bramley was the first to calculate the effect of extended nuclear charge on hyperfine structure and isotopic shift – an effect still known as the Breit-Rosenthal correction. She contributed to a number of other fields including applying electroluminescence to solid state displays and storage devices and developing high efficiency lasers. Bramley also invented coding techniques and methods of decoding pictorial information, later used in classified studies.

During World War II Bramley conducted some research in secret which she was unable to publish at the time. In the 1950s she worked at Monmouth Junior College where she served as head of the mathematics department.

Honors and awards 

 Sarah Berliner Research Fellow, American Association of University Women
 Fellow, American Physical Society
 Fellow, Institute of Electrical & Electronics Engineers
 Wise Lifetime Achievement Award 1985, The InterAgency Committee on Women in Science and Engineering; cited as the most outstanding woman scientist in the federal government.
 Fellow, Washington Academy of Science

References 

1909 births
1997 deaths
American women physicists
Russian emigrants to Germany
University of Paris alumni
New York University alumni
University of Michigan fellows
20th-century American physicists
20th-century American women scientists
Monmouth University faculty
Brooklyn College faculty
American women academics
Lithuanian emigrants to the United States